John Rose is an American concert organist.  He has performed in 45 of the United States and has made a number of foreign concert tours to Australia, Canada, Mexico, Brazil and various European countries.  He is College Organist at Trinity College in Connecticut, a post he has held since 1977.

In the United States he has performed at halls such as the Kennedy Center in Washington, Orchestra Hall in Chicago, Davies Hall in San Francisco, the Mormon Tabernacle in Salt Lake City, and a host of other halls, churches, and campuses around the country both as recitalist and orchestral soloist. In Europe his tours have been highlighted by performances at such landmark churches as St. Paul’s Cathedral and Westminster Abbey in London and Notre Dame Cathedral in Paris. He has made festival appearances in Australia, Belgium, England, Mexico, Norway, and Scotland.
	
He has been a featured artist at national and regional conventions of the American Guild of Organists, the Organ Historical Society, the National Association of Pastoral Musicians, the American Pipe Organ Builders Association, and the American Institute of Organbuilders.

John Rose began his performance career at the age of 20 when he became Organist of the landmark Cathedral of the Sacred Heart in Newark, New Jersey. The cathedral’s huge Gothic structure, fine large pipe organ, and ideal acoustics inspired the young musician to become a recitalist and encouraged him to concentrate on the literature of the French symphonic school of composers, which he has made a performance and recording specialty. During his nearly nine years at the Newark cathedral he founded a concert series which during his tenure achieved international recognition. He also staged a marathon concert in which he, Robert Glasgow, and Rollin Smith performed the complete six Vierne symphonies for organ, drawing an audience of fourteen hundred from several states and helping to launch Vierne’s return to a higher profile among American organists. John Rose was invited to return to Newark cathedral as a performer in celebration of the thirtieth anniversary of the Cathedral Concert Series in 1999.
	
John Rose has recorded sixteen CD and LP albums, and his discography is highlighted by “The French Romantics” series which has drawn extensive radio airplay and enthusiastic critical praise. Critic Scott Cantrell called one of his albums “possibly the most exciting organ recording I’ve ever heard.”
	
Among several noted composers who have dedicated works to John Rose is Malcolm Williamson, Master of the Queens Music to H.M. Elizabeth II of Great Britain. He has long been associated with the church music institute held each summer at Colby College in Maine, serving since 1988 as its director. He has been awarded a performance grant by the National Endowment for the Arts, and has received “Young Artist of the Year” honors from the national journal Musical America. He is an elected member of the Connecticut Academy of Arts and Sciences and an elected Fellow of the Royal Society of Arts in London.
	
John Rose is a graduate of Rutgers University, and was an instructor in organ at the university’s Newark campus while cathedral organist there. His primary organ teacher was the late virtuoso Virgil Fox, with whom he studied privately for over seven years.

External links
  Phillip Truckenbrod Concert Artists website
 Trinity College website
  Details on John Rose's "Star Wars" CD

Living people
American classical organists
American male organists
Cathedral organists
Rutgers University alumni
Place of birth missing (living people)
1948 births
21st-century organists
21st-century American male musicians
21st-century American keyboardists
Male classical organists